was a bestselling Japanese poet; her first anthology Kujikenaide (″Don't lose heart″), published in 2009, sold 1.58 million copies. In comparison, poetry book sales of 10,000 are considered successful in Japan. Her anthology also topped Japan's Oricon bestseller chart. It was originally self-published, but upon seeing its success the publisher Asuka Shinsha reissued it, with new artwork, in 2010. It contains 42 poems. After back pain forced Shibata to give up her hobby of classical Japanese dance, she turned to writing poetry at the age of 92, at the suggestion of her son Kenichi. As of 2011 she was writing poems for a second anthology, lived alone in the Tokyo suburbs, and was a widow.

There was a TV documentary about Shibata in December 2010.

Shibata died on January 20, 2013, in a nursing home in Utsunomiya, north of Tokyo. She was 101.

References

1911 births
2013 deaths
Japanese centenarians
Women centenarians
21st-century Japanese poets